Gowrie is a city in Webster County, Iowa. The population was 952 at the time of the 2020 census. The town has a swimming pool, golf course, athletic stadium, and curb-and-gutter throughout the community.

History
A post office called Gowrie has been in operation since 1871. The city was named after Gowrie, in Scotland.

Gowrie began as a stop on the railroad. It grew in its early years as the Swedish settlers built a local economy which served area farmers. Today, the town has a swimming pool, golf course, athletic stadium, and curb-and-gutter throughout the town. Historically, its peak was 1970, and at that time the downtown area had the following businesses: (* designate companies still in business) Gowrie Municipal Swimming Pool*, Gowrie Gowrie Youth Center/Skating Rink*, Johnson RediMix, Johnson Sinclair Service, Bruntlett Elevator*, Johnson Lumber Company, Gowrie Dry Clean, Carr's Grocery, Gambles Hardware, Webster-Calhoun Co-op Telephone Co.*, Sunray DX, Palmer and Son's Funeral Home*, Dairy Sweet, Buskee Industries, Gowrie Car Wash, Ranniger's Appliance, Ranniger's Water Care, Imels Clothing, Wendells Appliances, Redman Barber Shop, Erb Law Offices, Dr. Rungee, DDS, Dr. Borgen, MD, Paladium Lanes Bowling Alley, First National Bank, Gowrie Cafe, Palmer Hardware, Hasty's Cafe, Smith's Meat Market, Gowrie Star Theater, Earl Braend Ford, The Canteen, Larson's Phillip 66, Standard Gas Station, VFW, Gowrie Library, Lee Benson Motors*, Pontiac, Jansa TV Repair, Laundromat, Skip's Tap, Lane Barber Shop, The White House Sundry, and The Gowrie News. Other businesses in town included: Dixon Hatcheries, Hubbard Veterinary Clinic, Lizer Sale barn, Anderson Elevator, Gowrie Municipal Golf Course*, Swanson Florist and Garden Center*, and the COOP.

Geography
Gowrie is located at  (42.279715, -94.291520).

Demographics

2010 census
As of the census of 2010, there were 1,037 people, 442 households, and 281 families living in the city. The racial makeup of the city was 97.7% White, 1.0% African American, 0.1% Native American, 0.2% Asian, and 1.1% from two or more races. Hispanic or Latino of any race were 1.6% of the population.

There were 442 households, of which 33.0% had children under the age of 18 living with them, 47.1% were married couples living together, 12.4% had a female householder with no husband present, 4.1% had a male householder with no wife present, and 36.4% were non-families. 33.3% of all households were made up of individuals, and 19.9% had someone living alone who was 65 years of age or older. The average household size was 2.28 and the average family size was 2.88.

The median age in the city was 45.2 years. 25.4% of residents were under the age of 18; 5.6% were between the ages of 18 and 24; 18.8% were from 25 to 44; 25.9% were from 45 to 64; and 24.4% were 65 years of age or older. The gender makeup of the city was 46.6% male and 53.4% female.

2000 census
As of the census of 2000, there were 1,038 people, 429 households, and 277 families living in the city. The racial makeup of the city was 98.36% White, 0.19% African American, 0.29% Native American, 0.39% Asian, 0.29% from other races, and 0.48% from two or more races. Hispanic or Latino of any race were 1.06% of the population.

There were 429 households, out of which 28.7% had children under the age of 18 living with them, 54.5% were married couples living together, 7.7% had a female householder with no husband present, and 35.4% were non-families. 32.9% of all households were made up of individuals, and 21.7% had someone living alone who was 65 years of age or older. The average household size was 2.32 and the average family size was 2.96.

24.5% are under the age of 18, 6.7% from 18 to 24, 21.2% from 25 to 44, 20.7% from 45 to 64, and 26.9% who were 65 years of age or older. The median age was 43 years. For every 100 females, there were 84.4 males. For every 100 females age 18 and over, there were 79.0 males.

The median income for a household in the city was $36,136, and the median income for a family was $44,342. Males had a median income of $30,398 versus $20,278 for females. The per capita income for the city was $17,348. About 4.0% of families and 6.2% of the population were below the poverty line, including 8.0% of those under age 18 and 5.9% of those age 65 or over.

Education
Gowrie is served by the Prairie Valley Community School District, which formed on July 1, 1993 with the merger of the Cedar Valley Community School District and the Prairie Community School District.

Arts and culture

Each year, the town hosts the Gowrie Fourth of July Celebration, which draws thousands of people from around the state for the parade, fireworks, carnival, and bandshell performances. The parade is the longest running consecutive parade in Iowa, beginning in 1873 and continuing each year since. Crowds of 10,000-20,000 are common. Some highlights of the past include a visit by President Richard Nixon's daughter, Patricia, in 1968, the Bill Riley Talent Show for several years, an appearance by the O's Gold Famous 40 Horse Hitch in 1976, and a concert by opera singer Simon Estes in 2011.

Several churches are located in the community, including both Methodist and Lutheran churches. Zion Evangelical Lutheran Church, a magnificent open-arched structure, was built by hometown business, Johnson Lumber Company, owned by Axel and Carl Johnson, and was completed in March, 1931.

Notable people

Darrell Huff, writer
Everett Franklin Lindquist, educator and creator of the ACT
Ronald H. Lingren, clinical psychologist and member of the Wisconsin State Assembly
Carl A. Youngdale, decorated Major general in the United States Marine Corps

References

External links

  
Gowrie Iowa Portal style website, Government, Business, Recreation and more
City-Data Comprehensive Statistical Data and more about Gowrie

Cities in Iowa
Cities in Webster County, Iowa